Haibach ob der Donau is a municipality in the district of Eferding in the Austrian state of Upper Austria, Austria. It is situated near the Danube.

Geography
Haibach lies in the Hausruckviertel. About 45 percent of the municipality is forest and 41 percent farmland.

References

Sauwald
Cities and towns in Eferding District